The Antillean cave rat (Heteropsomys antillensis) is an extinct species of spiny rat of the genus Heteropsomys that was native to Puerto Rico.

References

Notes

Sources

Extinct animals of the United States
Heteropsomys
Mammals described in 1916
Taxobox binomials not recognized by IUCN